Saint-Marc-sur-Richelieu is a municipality in southwestern Quebec, Canada, on the Richelieu River in the Regional County Municipality of La Vallée-du-Richelieu. The population as of the Canada 2011 Census was 2,050.

Demographics

Population
Population trend:

Language
Mother tongue language (2006)

Gallery

See also
List of municipalities in Quebec

References

Municipalities in Quebec
Incorporated places in La Vallée-du-Richelieu Regional County Municipality